(24 September 1564 – 16 May 1620), better known in Japanese as , was an English navigator who, in 1600, was the first Englishman to reach Japan. He was on a ship called de Liefde under the leadership of Jacob Quaeckernaeck; it was the only surviving vessel from a five-ship expedition launched by a Rotterdam East India company, a forerunner of the United East India Company. Among the few survivors of the expedition who reached Japan, Adams and his second mate Jan Joosten were not allowed to leave the country, while Quaeckernaeck and Melchior van Santvoort were permitted to go back to the Dutch Republic to invite them to trade.

Adams, with Joosten, then settled in Japan, and the two became Western samurai.

Soon after Adams' arrival in Japan, he became a key advisor to the shōgun Tokugawa Ieyasu. Adams directed construction for the shōgun of the first Western-style ships in the country. He was later part of Japan's approving the establishment of trading factories by the Netherlands. He was also highly involved in Japan's Red Seal Asian trade, chartering and serving as captain of four expeditions to Southeast Asia. He died in Japan at age 55. He has been recognised as one of the most influential foreigners in Japan during this period.

Early life
Adams was born in Gillingham, Kent, England. When Adams was twelve his father died, and he was apprenticed to shipyard owner Master Nicholas Diggins at Limehouse for the seafaring life. He spent the next twelve years learning shipbuilding, astronomy, and navigation before entering the Royal Navy.

With England at war with Spain, Adams served in the Royal Navy under Sir Francis Drake. He saw naval service against the Spanish Armada in 1588 as master of the Richarde Dyffylde, a resupply ship. Adams was recorded to have married Mary Hyn in the parish church of St Dunstan's, Stepney on 20 August 1589 and they had two children: a son John and a daughter named Deliverance. Soon after, Adams became a pilot for the Barbary Company. During this service, Jesuit sources claim he took part in an expedition to the Arctic that lasted about two years, in search of a Northeast Passage along the coast of Siberia to the Far East. The veracity of this claim is somewhat suspect, because he never referred to such an expedition in his autobiographical letter written from Japan; its wording implies that the 1598 voyage was his first involvement with the Dutch. The Jesuit source may have misattributed to Adams a claim by one of the Dutch members of Mahu's crew who had been on Rijp's ship during the voyage that discovered Spitsbergen.

Expedition to the Far East

Attracted by the Dutch trade with India, Adams, then 34 years old, shipped as pilot major with a five-ship fleet dispatched from the isle of Texel to the Far East in 1598 by a company of Rotterdam merchants (a voorcompagnie, predecessor of the Dutch East India Company). His brother Thomas accompanied him. The Dutch were allied with England at that time; both were Protestant nations, and were fighting against Spain for Dutch independence.

The Adams brothers set sail from Texel on the Hoope and joined with the rest of the fleet on 24 June. The fleet consisted of:
 the Hoope ("Hope"), under Admiral Jacques Mahu (d. 1598), he was succeeded by Simon de Cordes (d. 1599) and Simon de Cordes Jr. This ship was lost near the Hawaiian Islands;
 the Liefde ("Love" or "Charity"), under Simon de Cordes, 2nd in command, succeeded by Gerrit van Beuningen and finally under Jacob Kwakernaak; this was the only ship which reached Japan
 the Geloof ("Faith"), under Gerrit van Beuningen, and in the end, Sebald de Weert; the only ship which came back in Rotterdam.
 the Trouw ("Loyalty"), under Jurriaan van Boekhout (d. 1599) and finally, Baltazar de Cordes; was captured in Tidore.
 the Blijde Boodschap ("Good Tiding" or "The Gospel"), under Sebald de Weert, and later, Dirck Gerritz was seized in Valparaiso.

Jacques Mahu and Simon de Cordes were the leaders of an expedition with the goal to reach Chile, Peru and other kingdoms (in New Spain like Nueva Galicia; Captaincy General of Guatemala; Nueva Vizcaya; New Kingdom of León and Santa Fe de Nuevo México). The fleet's original mission was to sail for the west coast of South America, where they would sell their cargo for silver, and to head for Japan only if the first mission failed. In that case, they were supposed to obtain silver in Japan and to buy spices in the Moluccas, before heading back to Europe. Their goal was to sail through the Strait of Magellan to get to their destination, which scared many sailors because of the harsh weather conditions. The first major expedition around South America was organized by a voorcompagnie, the Rotterdam or Magelhaen Company. It organized two fleets of five and four ships with 750 sailors and soldiers, including 30 English musicians.

After leaving Goeree on 27 June 1598 the ships sailed to the Channel, but anchored in the Downs till mid July. When the ships approached the shores of North Africa Simon de Cordes realized he had been far too generous in the early weeks of the voyage and instituted a 'bread policy'. At the end of August they landed on Santiago, Cape Verde and Mayo off the coast of Africa because of a lack of water and need for fresh fruit. They stayed around three weeks in the hope of buying some goats. Near Praia they succeeded in occupying a Portuguese castle on the top of a hill, but came back without anything substantial. At Brava, Cape Verde half of the crew of the "Hope" caught fever there, with most of the men sick, among them Admiral Jacques Mahu. After his death the leadership of the expedition was taken over by Simon de Cordes, with Van Beuningen as vice admiral. Because of contrary wind the fleet was blown off course (NE in the opposite direction) and arrived at Cape Lopez, Gabon, Central Africa. An outbreak of scurvy forced a landing on Annobón, on 9 December. Several men became sick because of dysentery. They stormed the island only to find that the Portuguese and their native allies had set fire to their own houses and fled into the hills. They put all the sick ashore to recover and left early January. Because of starvation the men fell into great weakness; some tried to eat leather. On 10 March 1599 they reached the Rio de la Plata, in Argentina. Early April they arrived at the Strait, 570 km long, 2 km wide at its narrowest point, with an inaccurate chart of the seabed. The wind turned out to be unfavorable and this remained so for the next four months. Under freezing temperatures and poor visibility they caught penguins, seals, mussels, duck and fish. About two hundred crew members died. On 23 August the weather improved.

On the Pacific

When finally the Pacific Ocean was reached on 3 September 1599, the ships were caught in a storm and lost sight of each other. The "Loyalty" and the "Believe" were driven back in the strait. After more than a year each ship went its own way.
The Geloof returned to Rotterdam in July 1600 with 36 men surviving of the original 109 crew.
De Cordes ordered his small fleet to wait four weeks for each other on Santa María Island, Chile, but some ships missed the island. Adams wrote "they brought us sheep and potatoes". From here the story becomes less reliable because of a lack of sources and changes in command. In early November, the "Hope" landed on Mocha Island where 27 people were killed by the people from Araucania, including Simon de Cordes. (In the account given to Olivier van Noort it was said that Simon der Cordes was slain at the Punta de Lavapie, but Adams gives Mocha Island as the scene of his death.) The "Love" hit the island, but went on to Punta de Lavapié near Concepción, Chile. A Spanish captain supplied the "Loyalty" and "Hope" with food; the Dutch helped him against the Araucans, who had killed 23 Dutch, including Thomas Adams (according to his brother in his second letter) and Gerrit van Beuningen, who was replaced by Jacob Quaeckernaeck.

During the voyage, before December 1598, Adams changed ships to the Liefde (originally named Erasmus and adorned by a wooden carving of Erasmus on her stern). The statue was preserved in the Ryuko-in Buddhist temple in Sano City, Tochigi-ken and moved to the Tokyo National Museum in the 1920s.  The Trouw reached Tidore (Eastern Indonesia). The crew were killed by the Portuguese in January 1601.

In fear of the Spaniards, the remaining crews determined to leave the island and sail across the Pacific. It was 27 November 1599 when the two ships sailed westward for Japan. On their way, the two ships made landfall in "certain islands" where eight sailors deserted the ships. Later during the voyage, a typhoon claimed the Hope with all hands, in late February 1600.

Arrival in Japan

In April 1600, after more than 19 months at sea, a crew of 23 sick and dying men (out of the 100 who started the voyage) brought the Liefde to anchor off the island of Kyūshū, Japan. Its cargo consisted of eleven chests of trade goods: coarse woolen cloth, glass beads, mirrors, and spectacles; and metal tools and weapons: nails, iron, hammers, nineteen bronze cannon; 5,000 cannonballs; 500 muskets, 300 chain-shot, and three chests filled with coats of mail.

When the nine surviving crew members were strong enough to stand, they made landfall on 19 April off Bungo (present-day Usuki, Ōita Prefecture). They were met by Japanese locals and Portuguese Jesuit missionary priests claiming that Adams' ship was a pirate vessel and that the crew should be executed as pirates. The ship was seized and the sickly crew were imprisoned at Osaka Castle on orders by Tokugawa Ieyasu, the daimyō of Edo and future shōgun. The nineteen bronze cannon of the Liefde were unloaded and, according to Spanish accounts, later used at the decisive Battle of Sekigahara on 21 October 1600.

Adams met Ieyasu in Osaka three times between May and June 1600. He was questioned by Ieyasu, then a guardian of the young son of the Taikō Toyotomi Hideyoshi, the ruler who had just died. Adams' knowledge of ships, shipbuilding and nautical smattering of mathematics appealed to Ieyasu.

Coming before the king, he viewed me well, and seemed to be wonderfully favourable. He made many signs unto me, some of which I understood, and some I did not. In the end, there came one that could speak Portuguese. By him, the king demanded of me of what land I was, and what moved us to come to his land, being so far off. I showed unto him the name of our country, and that our land had long sought out the East Indies, and desired friendship with all kings and potentates in way of merchandise, having in our land diverse commodities, which these lands had not… Then he asked whether our country had wars? I answered him yea, with the Spaniards and Portugals, being in peace with all other nations. Further, he asked me, in what I did believe? I said, in God, that made heaven and earth. He asked me diverse other questions of things of religions, and many other things: As what way we came to the country. Having a chart of the whole world, I showed him, through the Strait of Magellan. At which he wondered, and thought me to lie. Thus, from one thing to another, I abode with him till mid-night. (from William Adams' letter to his wife)

Adams wrote that Ieyasu denied the Jesuits' request for execution on the ground that:
we as yet had not done to him nor to none of his land any harm or damage; therefore against Reason or Justice to put us to death. If our country had wars the one with the other, that was no cause that he should put us to death; with which they were out of heart that their cruel pretence failed them. For which God be forever praised. (William Adams' letter to his wife)

Ieyasu ordered the crew to sail the Liefde from Bungo to Edo where, rotten and beyond repair, she sank.

Japan's first western-style sailing ships
In 1604, Tokugawa ordered Adams and his companions to help Mukai Shōgen, who was commander-in-chief of the navy of Uraga, to build Japan's first Western-style ship. The sailing ship was built at the harbour of Itō on the east coast of the Izu Peninsula, with carpenters from the harbour supplying the manpower for the construction of an 80-ton vessel. It was used to survey the Japanese coast. The shōgun ordered a larger ship of 120 tons to be built the following year; it was slightly smaller than the Liefde, which was 150 tons. According to Adams, Tokugawa "came aboard to see it, and the sight whereof gave him great content". In 1610, the 120-ton ship (later named San Buena Ventura) was lent to shipwrecked Spanish sailors. They sailed it to New Spain, accompanied by a mission of twenty-two Japanese led by Tanaka Shōsuke.

Following the construction, Tokugawa invited Adams to visit his palace whenever he liked and "that always I must come in his presence."

Other survivors of the Liefde were also rewarded with favours, and were allowed to pursue foreign trade. Most of the survivors left Japan in 1605 with the help of the daimyō of Hirado. Although Adams did not receive permission to leave Japan until 1613, Melchior van Santvoort and Jan Joosten van Lodensteijn engaged in trade between Japan and Southeast Asia and reportedly made a fortune. Both of them were reported by Dutch traders as being in Ayutthaya in early 1613, sailing richly cargoed junks.

In 1609 Adams contacted the interim governor of the Philippines, Rodrigo de Vivero y Aberrucia on behalf of Tokugawa Ieyasu, who wished to establish direct trade contacts with New Spain. Friendly letters were exchanged, officially starting relations between Japan and New Spain. Adams is also recorded as having chartered Red Seal Ships during his later travels to Southeast Asia. (The Ikoku Tokai Goshuinjō has a reference to Miura Anjin receiving a shuinjō, a document bearing a red Shogunal seal authorising the holder to engage in foreign trade, in 1614.)

Samurai status
Taking a liking to Adams, the shōgun appointed him as a diplomatic and trade advisor, bestowing great privileges upon him. Ultimately, Adams became his personal advisor on all things related to Western powers and civilization. After a few years, Adams replaced the Jesuit Padre João Rodrigues as the Shogun's official interpreter. Padre Valentim Carvalho wrote: "After he had learned the language, he had access to Ieyasu and entered the palace at any time"; he also described him as "a great engineer and mathematician".

Adams had a wife Mary Hyn and two children back in England, but Ieyasu forbade the Englishman to leave Japan. He was presented with two swords representing the authority of a Samurai. The Shogun decreed that William Adams the pilot was dead and that Miura Anjin (三浦按針), a samurai, was born. According to the shōgun, this action "freed" Adams to serve the Shogunate permanently, effectively making Adams' wife in England a widow. (Adams managed to send regular support payments to her after 1613 via the English and Dutch companies.) Adams also was given the title of hatamoto (bannerman), a high-prestige position as a direct retainer in the shōgun's court.

Adams was given generous revenues: "For the services that I have done and do daily, being employed in the Emperor's service, the emperor has given me a living" (Letters). He was granted a fief in Hemi (Jpn: 逸見) within the boundaries of present-day Yokosuka City, "with eighty or ninety husbandmen, that be my slaves or servants" (Letters). His estate was valued at 250 koku (a measure of the yearly income of the land in rice, with one koku defined as the quantity of rice sufficient to feed one person for one year). He finally wrote "God hath provided for me after my great misery" (Letters), by which he meant the disaster-ridden voyage that had initially brought him to Japan.

Adams' estate was located next to the harbour of Uraga, the traditional point of entrance to Edo Bay. There he was recorded as dealing with the cargoes of foreign ships. John Saris related that when he visited Edo in 1613, Adams had resale rights for the cargo of a Spanish ship at anchor in Uraga Bay.

It is rumored that William had a child born in Hirado with another Japanese woman.

Adams' position gave him the means to marry Oyuki (お雪), the adopted daughter of Magome Kageyu. He was a highway official who was in charge of a packhorse exchange on one of the grand imperial roads that led out of Edo (roughly present-day Tokyo). Although Magome was important, Oyuki was not of noble birth, nor high social standing. Adams may have married from affection rather than for social reasons. Adams and Oyuki had a son Joseph and a daughter Susanna. Adams was constantly traveling for work. Initially, he tried to organise an expedition in search of the Arctic passage that had eluded him previously.

Adams had a high regard for Japan, its people, and its civilisation:
The people of this Land of Japan are good of nature, courteous above measure, and valiant in war: their justice is severely executed without any partiality upon transgressors of the law. They are governed in great civility. I mean, not a land better governed in the world by civil policy. The people be very superstitious in their religion, and are of diverse opinions.

Establishment of the Dutch East India Company in Japan

In 1604 Ieyasu sent the Liefde'''s captain, Jacob Quaeckernaeck, and the treasurer, Melchior van Santvoort, on a shōgun-licensed Red Seal Ship to Patani in Southeast Asia. He ordered them to contact the Dutch East India Company trading factory, which had just been established in 1602, in order to bring more western trade to Japan and break the Portuguese monopoly. In 1605, Adams obtained a letter of authorization from Ieyasu formally inviting the Dutch to trade with Japan. 

Hampered by conflicts with the Portuguese and limited resources in Asia, the Dutch were not able to send ships to Japan until 1609. Two Dutch ships, commanded by Jacques Specx, De Griffioen (the "Griffin", 19 cannons) and Roode Leeuw met Pijlen (the "Red lion with arrows", 400 tons, 26 cannons), were sent from Holland and reached Japan on 2 July 1609. The men of this Dutch expeditionary fleet established a trading base or "factory" on Hirado Island. Two Dutch envoys, Puyck and van den Broek, were the official bearers of a letter from Prince Maurice of Nassau to the court of Edo. Adams negotiated on behalf of these emissaries. The Dutch obtained free trading rights throughout Japan and to establish a trading factory there. (By contrast, the Portuguese were allowed to sell their goods only in Nagasaki at fixed, negotiated prices.)

The Hollandes be now settled (in Japan) and I have got them that privilege as the Spaniards and Portingals could never get in this 50 or 60 years in Japan.

After obtaining this trading right through an edict of Tokugawa Ieyasu on 24 August 1609, the Dutch inaugurated a trading factory in Hirado on 20 September 1609. The Dutch preserved their "trade pass" (Dutch: Handelspas) in Hirado and then Dejima as a guarantee of their trading rights during the following two centuries that they operated in Japan.

Establishment of an English trading factory
In 1611, Adams learned of an English settlement in Banten Sultanate, present-day Indonesia. He wrote asking them to convey news of him to his family and friends in England. He invited them to engage in trade with Japan which "the Hollanders have here an Indies of money."

In 1613, the English captain John Saris arrived at Hirado in the ship Clove, intending to establish a trading factory for the British East India Company. The Dutch East India Company (VOC) already had a major post at Hirado.

Saris noted Adams' praise of Japan and adoption of Japanese customs:
He persists in giving "admirable and affectionated commendations of Japan. It is generally thought amongst us that he is a naturalized Japaner." (John Saris)

In Hirado, Adams refused to stay in English quarters, residing instead with a local Japanese magistrate. The English noted that he wore Japanese dress and spoke Japanese fluently. Adams estimated the cargo of the Clove was of little value, essentially broadcloth, tin and cloves (acquired in the Spice Islands), saying that "such things as he had brought were not very vendible".

Adams traveled with Saris to Suruga, where they met with Ieyasu at his principal residence in September. The Englishmen continued to Kamakura where they visited the noted Kamakura Great Buddha. (Sailors etched their names of the Daibutsu, made in 1252.) They continued to Edo, where they met Ieyasu's son Hidetada, who was nominally shōgun, although Ieyasu retained most of the decision-making powers. During that meeting, Hidetada gave Saris two varnished suits of armour for King James I. As of 2015, one of these suits of armour is housed in the Tower of London, the other is on display in the Royal Armouries Museum, Leeds. The suits were signed by Iwai Yozaemon of Nanbu.  They were part of a series of presentation armours of ancient 15th-century Dō-maru style.

On their return, the English party visited Tokugawa again. He conferred trading privileges to the English by a Red Seal permit, giving them "free license to abide, buy, sell and barter" in Japan. The English party returned to Hirado on 9 October 1613.

At this meeting, Adams asked for and obtained Tokugawa's authorisation to return to his home country but he finally declined Saris' offer to take him back to England: "I answered him I had spent in this country many years, through which I was poor... [and] desirous to get something before my return". His true reasons seem to lie rather with his profound antipathy for Saris: "The reason I would not go with him was for diverse injuries done against me, which were things to me very strange and unlooked for." (William Adams letters)

Adams accepted employment with the newly founded Hirado trading factory, signing a contract on 24November 1613, with the East India Company for the yearly salary of 100 English Pounds. This was more than double the regular salary of 40 Pounds earned by the other factors at Hirado. Adams had a lead role, under Richard Cocks and together with six other compatriots (Tempest Peacock, Richard Wickham, William Eaton, Walter Carwarden, Edmund Sayers and William Nealson), in organising this new English settlement.

Adams had advised Saris against the choice of Hirado, which was small and far away from the major markets in Osaka and Edo; he had recommended selection of Uraga near Edo for a post, but Saris wanted to keep an eye on the Dutch activities.

During the ten-year operations of the East India Company (1613 to 1623), only three English ships after the Clove brought cargoes directly from London to Japan. They were invariably described as having poor value on the Japanese market. The only trade which helped support the factory was that organised between Japan and South-East Asia; this was chiefly Adams selling Chinese goods for Japanese silver:
Were it not for hope of trade into China, or procuring some benefit from Siam, Pattania and Cochin China, it were no staying in Japon, yet it is certen here is silver enough & may be carried out at pleasure, but then we must bring them commodities to their liking. (Richard Cocks' diary, 1617)

Religious rivalries
The Portuguese and other Catholic religious orders in Japan considered Adams a rival as an English Protestant. After Adams' power had grown, the Jesuits tried to convert him, then offered to secretly bear him away from Japan on a Portuguese ship. The Jesuits' willingness to disobey the order by Ieyasu prohibiting Adams from leaving Japan showed that they feared his growing influence. Catholic priests asserted that he was trying to discredit them. In 1614, Carvalho complained of Adams and other merchants in his annual letter to the Pope, saying that "by false accusation [Adams and others] have rendered our preachers such objects of suspicion that he [Ieyasu] fears and readily believes that they are rather spies than sowers of the Holy Faith in his kingdom."

Ieyasu, influenced by Adams' counsels and disturbed by unrest caused by the numerous Catholic converts, expelled the Portuguese Jesuits from Japan in 1614. He demanded that Japanese Catholics abandon their faith. Adams apparently warned Ieyasu against Spanish approaches as well.

Character
After fifteen years spent in Japan, Adams had a difficult time establishing relations with the English arrivals. He initially shunned the company of the newly arrived English sailors in 1613 and could not get on good terms with Saris but Richard Cocks, the head of the Hirado factory, came to appreciate Adams' character and what he had acquired of Japanese self-control. In a letter to the East India Company, Cocks wrote:

Participation in Asian trade

Adams later engaged in various exploratory and commercial ventures. He tried to organise an expedition to the legendary Northwest Passage from Asia, which would have greatly reduced the sailing distance between Japan and Europe. Ieyasu asked him if "our countrimen could not find the northwest passage" and Adams contacted the East India Company to organise manpower and supplies. The expedition never got underway.

In his later years, Adams worked for the English East India Company. He made a number of trading voyages to Siam in 1616 and Cochinchina in 1617 and 1618, sometimes for the Company, sometimes for his own account. He is recorded in Japanese records as the owner of a Red Seal Ship of 500 tons.

Given the few ships that the company sent from England and the poor trading value of their cargoes (broadcloth, knives, looking glasses, Indian cotton, etc.), Adams was influential in gaining trading certificates from the shōgun to allow the company to participate in the Red Seal system. It made a total of seven junk voyages to Southeast Asia with mixed profit results. Four were led by William Adams as captain. Adams renamed a ship he acquired in 1617 as Gift of God; he sailed it on his expedition that year to Cochinchina. The expeditions he led are described more fully below.

1614 Siam expedition
In 1614, Adams wanted to organise a trade expedition to Siam to bolster the company factory's activities and cash situation. He bought and upgraded a 200-ton Japanese junk for the company, renaming her as Sea Adventure; and hired about 120 Japanese sailors and merchants, as well as several Chinese traders, an Italian and a Castilian (Spanish) trader. The heavily laden ship left in November 1614. The merchants Richard Wickham and Edmund Sayers of the English factory's staff also joined the voyage.

The expedition was to purchase raw silk, Chinese goods, sappan wood, deer skins and ray skins (the latter used for the hilts of Japanese swords). The ship carried £1,250 in silver and £175 of merchandise (Indian cottons, Japanese weapons and lacquerware). The party encountered a typhoon near the Ryukyu Islands (modern Okinawa) and had to stop there to repair from 27 December 1614 until May 1615. It returned to Japan in June 1615 without having completed any trade.

1615 Siam expedition
Adams left Hirado in November 1615 for Ayutthaya in Siam on the refitted Sea Adventure, intent on obtaining sappan wood for resale in Japan. His cargo was chiefly silver (£600) and the Japanese and Indian goods unsold from the previous voyage.

He bought vast quantities of the high-profit products. His partners obtained two ships in Siam in order to transport everything back to Japan. Adams sailed the Sea Adventure to Japan with 143 tonnes of sappan wood and 3,700 deer skins, returning to Hirado in 47 days. (The return trip took from 5 June and 22 July 1616). Sayers, on a hired Chinese junk, reached Hirado in October 1616 with 44 tons of sappan, wood. The third ship, a Japanese junk, brought 4,560 deer skins to Nagasaki, arriving in June 1617 after the monsoon.

Less than a week before Adams' return, Ieyasu had died. Adams accompanied Cocks and Eaton to court to offer company presents to the new ruler, Hidetada. Although Ieyasu's death seems to have weakened Adams' political influence, Hidetada agreed to maintain the English trading privileges. He also issued a new Red Seal permit (Shuinjō) to Adams, which allowed him to continue trade activities overseas under the shōgun's protection. His position as hatamoto was also renewed.

On this occasion, Adams and Cocks also visited the Japanese Admiral Mukai Shōgen Tadakatsu, who lived near Adams' estate. They discussed plans for a possible invasion of the Catholic Philippines.

1617 Cochinchina expedition
In March 1617, Adams set sail for Cochinchina, having purchased the junk Sayers had brought from Siam and renamed it the Gift of God. He intended to find two English factors, Tempest Peacock and Walter Carwarden, who had departed from Hirado two years before to explore commercial opportunities on the first voyage to South East Asia by the Hirado English Factory. Adams learned in Cochinchina that Peacock had been plied with drink, and killed for his silver. Carwarden, who was waiting in a boat downstream, realised that Peacock had been killed and hastily tried to reach his ship. His boat overturned and he drowned.

Adams sold a small cargo of broadcloth, Indian piece goods and ivory in Cochinchina for the modest amount of £351.

1618 Cochinchina expedition
In 1618, Adams is recorded as having organised his last Red Seal trade expedition to Cochinchina and Tonkin (modern Vietnam), the last expedition of the English Hirado Factory to Southeast Asia. The ship, a chartered Chinese junk, left Hirado on 11 March 1618 but met with bad weather that forced it to stop at Ōshima in the northern Ryukyu Islands. The ship sailed back to Hirado in May.

Those expeditions to Southeast Asia helped the English factory survive for some time, during that period, sappan wood resold in Japan with a 200% profit, until the factory fell into bankruptcy due to high expenditures.

Death and family legacy

Adams died at Hirado, north of Nagasaki, on 16 May 1620, at the age of 55. He was buried in Nagasaki, where his grave marker may still be seen. His gravesite is next to a memorial to Saint Francis Xavier. In his will, he left his townhouse in Edo, his fief in Hemi, and 500 British pounds to be divided evenly between his family in England and his family in Japan. Cocks wrote: "I cannot but be sorrowful for the loss of such a man as Capt William Adams, he having been in such favour with two Emperors of Japan as never any Christian in these part of the world." (Cocks' diary)

Cocks records that Hidetada transferred the lordship from William Adams to his son Joseph Adams with the attendant rights to the estate at Hemi: He (Hidetada) has confirmed the lordship to his son, which the other emperor (Ieyasu) gave to the father. (Cocks' diary)

Cocks continued to remain in contact with Adams' Japanese family, sending gifts; On the Christmas after Adams' death, Cocks gave Joseph his father's sword and dagger. In March 1622, he offered silks to Joseph and Susanna. Cocks also administered Adams' trading rights (the shuinjō) for the benefit of Adams' children, Joseph and Susanna. He carried this out conscientiously.

Back in England, Adams' daughter Deliverance married Ratcliff mariner Raph Goodchild at St Dunstan's, Stepney on 30 September 1618. They had two daughters, Abigail in October 1619 who died on the same month, and Jane in April 1621. Deliverance would later marry for a second time, to John Wright at St Alfege Church, Greenwich on 13 October 1624.

In 1623, the unprofitable English trading factory at Hirado was dissolved by the East India Company and Cocks departed for England, the Dutch traded on Adams' children's behalf via the Red Seal ships. Joseph Adams inherited the title of Miura Anjin became a trader and made five voyages to Cochinchina and Siam between 1624 and 1635.

By 1629 only two of Adams' shipmates from 1600 survived in Japan. Melchior van Santvoort and Vincent Romeyn lived quietly in Nagasaki.

In 1635, Tokugawa Iemitsu enforced the Sakoku Edict for Japan to be closed against foreign trading; both Joseph and Susanna disappeared from historical records at that time.

Adams has a second memorial monument at the location of his residence in Hemi. Consisting of a pair of hōkyōintō, the tuff memorial on the right is that of Adams, and the andesite one of the left is for his wife. The monuments were erected by his family in accordance with his will, and the site was designated as a National Historic Site in 1923.

Honours

 A town in Edo (modern Tokyo), Anjin-chō (in modern-day Nihonbashi) was named for Adams, who had a house there. Anjin-chō no longer exists in Nihonbashi and is now known as Nihonbashi Muromachi 1-Chōme. However within Muromachi 1-Chōme a street, Anjin-dori, remains named after Adams.
 A village and a railroad station in his fiefdom, Hemi, in modern Yokosuka, were named for him.
 In the city of Itō, Shizuoka, the Miura Anjin Festival is held annually on 10 August. On the seafront at Itō is a monument to Adams. Next to it is a plaque inscribed with Edmund Blunden's poem, "To the Citizens of Ito", which commemorates Adams' achievement.
 Adams' birth town, Gillingham, has held a Will Adams Festival every September since 2000. Since the late 20th century, both Itō and Yokosuka have become sister cities of Gillingham.
 A monument to Adams was installed in Watling Street, Gillingham, Kent, opposite Darland Avenue. The monument was unveiled 11 May 1934 by Tsuneo Matsudaira GCVO, Japanese ambassador to the Court of St James.
 A roundabout named Will Adams Roundabout with a Japanese theme, just along from the Gillingham monument to Adams, with two roads named after the Gillingham sister cities "Ito Way" and "Yokosuka Way"
 The townhouse of Will Adams still exists in Hirado. It is currently a sweet shop called Tsutaya at 431 Kihikidacho. It is known as Anjin no Yakata (Anjin's House).

Analysis of skeletal remains

William Adams was buried in 1620, in Hirado, Nagasaki Prefecture. However, a few years later foreign cemeteries were destroyed and there was prosecution of Christians by the Tokugawa shogunate. The bones of Anjin were taken for safekeeping and reburied. In 1931, skeletal remains were first discovered there and assumed to be of Anjin, but this could not be confirmed due to technological limitations at the time. The remains were later placed in a Showa period ceramic funerary urn and reburied where they were discovered.

In July 2017, the excavation of the skeletal remains began at the William Adams Memorial Park on Sakigata Hill, Hirado. In 2019, Japanese archaeologists announced the discovery of bones at the site believed to be those of Adams. These remains match the 1931 description. The subsequent biomolecular anthropological investigation of the genetic background showed the mtDNA analysis indicates Anjin's mitochondrial DNA likely belongs to haplogroup H. The analysis also showed aspects such as the dietary habits and burial style matched with Anjin. In April 2020, the University of Tokyo conducted conclusive forensic tests on the bones and confirmed it was William Adams' grave. Confirmation of the identity of the remains may have been possible with DNA data from living relatives of Adams. However, even if living relatives had been identified, there would probably have been the equivalent of about eight generations of genetic difference between them and Adams. Thus there may not have been sufficient similarities to establish with sufficient certainty whether such a relationship existed.

Representation in other media
 James Clavell based his best-selling novel Shōgun (1975) on Adams' life and changed the name of his protagonist to "John Blackthorne". Its was adapted as a popular television mini-series, Shōgun (1980). It was also adapted as a Broadway production, Shōgun: The Musical (1990), and the video game James Clavell's Shōgun (1989).
 Michel Foucault retold Adams' tale in The Discourse on Language. According to Foucault, the story embodies one of the "great myths of European culture," and the idea that a mere sailor could teach mathematics to the Japanese shogun shows the difference between the open exchange of knowledge in Europe, as opposed to the secretive control of knowledge under "oriental tyranny." In fact, however, Adams was not a mere sailor but the chief navigator of the fleet, and his value to the Shogun was along the practical lines of shipbuilding.

There were numerous earlier works of fiction based on Adams.
 William Dalton wrote Will Adams, The First Englishman in Japan: A Romantic Biography (London, 1861).
 Richard Blaker's The Needlewatcher (London, 1932) is the least romantic of the novels; he consciously attempted to de-mythologize Adams and write a careful historical work of fiction.
 James Scherer's Pilot and Shōgun dramatises a series of incidents based on Adams' life.
 American Robert Lund wrote Daishi-san (New York, 1960).
 Christopher Nicole's Lord of the Golden Fan (1973) portrays Adams as sexually frustrated in England and freed by living in Japan, where he has numerous encounters. The work is considered light pornography.
 In 2002, Giles Milton's historical biography Samurai William (2002) is based on historical sources, especially Richard Cocks' diary.
 The 2002 alternate history novel Ruled Britannia by Harry Turtledove features a brief appearance by Adams, piloting cargo and passengers between England and Ostend, both of which are puppet states of the Habsburg Empire in this timeline.
 In the second season of Heroes, a story set in samurai-era Japan features an Englishman who seems to be based on Adams.
 A book series called Young Samurai is about a young English boy who is ship wrecked in Japan, and is trained as a samurai.
 Adams also serves as the template for the protagonist in the PlayStation 4 and PC video game series Nioh (2017) and non-playable in its prequel/sequel hybrid game (2020), but with supernatural and historical fiction elements. Unlike the historical William Adams, the game portrays him as an Irishman. As of the end of the second game, some time after managing to arrest the Spaniard Maria, he married Okatsu and had an English-Japanese son named Joseph who inherited his mother's guardian spirit.
 This version also appeared in the Warriors series' crossover game, Warriors All-Stars.

Depiction

According to Professor Derek Massarella of Chuo University in Tokyo:

There is however one genuine contemporary image. "It is a derivative drawing of William Adams, which appears to be based in a sketch attributed to Dorothy Burmingham, from a description given by Melchior von Santvoort. The original drawing is to be found at the Rotterdam Maritime Museum, whose specialist Marcel Kroon considers it to be from Adams' time. A copy is preserved at the Bodleian Library, University of Oxford."

See also

 Anglo-Japanese relations
 Jan Joosten – known in Japanese as Yan Yōsuten, was a Dutch colleague of Adams, and the only known Dutch samurai. The Yaesu neighbourhood in Chūō, Tokyo was named for him.
 Henry Schnell – known in Japanese as Hiramatsu Buhei, was a Prussian arms dealer, who served the Aizu domain as a military instructor and procurer of weapons.
 Eugène Collache – French Navy officer, who fought for the shōgun during the Boshin War (1868–1869).
 Jules Brunet (1838–1911) – French officer who fought for the shōgun in the Boshin War
 Ernest Mason Satow (1843–1929) – British scholar, diplomat and Japanologist
 Hendrick Hamel (1630–1692) – first European to live in the Joseon-dynasty era in Korea (1666) and write about it
 Yasuke (b. c. 1556) – a black (African) retainer briefly in the service of the Japanese warlord Nobunaga Oda
 List of foreign-born samurai in Japan
 List of Westerners who visited Japan before 1868

Notes

References
 England's Earliest Intercourse with Japan, by C. W. Hillary (1905)
 Letters written by the English Residents in Japan, ed. by N. Murakami (1900, containing Adams' Letters reprinted from Memorials of the Empire of Japan, ed. by T. Rundall, Hakluyt Society, 1850)
 Diary of Richard Cocks, with preface by N. Murakami (1899, reprinted from the Hakluyt Society ed. 1883)
 Hildreth, Richard, Japan as it was and is (1855)
 John Harris, Navigantium atque Itinerantium Bibliotheca (1764), i. 856
 Voyage of John Saris, edited by Sir Ernest M. Satow (Hakluyt Society, 1900)
 Asiatic Society of Japan Transactions, xxvi. (sec. 1898) pp. I and 194, where four formerly unpublished letters of Adams are printed;
 Collection of State Papers; East Indies, China and Japan. The MS. of his logs written during his voyages to Siam and China is in the Bodleian Library at Oxford.
 Samurai William: The Adventurer Who Unlocked Japan, by Giles Milton
 William Adams and Early English Enterprise in Japan, by Anthony Farrington and Derek Massarella 
 Adams the Pilot: The Life and Times of Captain William Adams: 1564–1620, by William Corr, Curzon Press, 1995 
 The English Factory in Japan 1613–1623, ed. by Anthony Farrington, British Library, 1991. (Includes all of William Adams' extant letters, as well as his will.)
 A World Elsewhere. Europe’s Encounter with Japan in the Sixteenth and Seventeenth Centuries, by Derek Massarella, Yale University Press, 1990.
 Recollections of Japan, Hendrik Doeff, 

Hardcopy
 The Needle-Watcher: The Will Adams Story, British Samurai by Richard Blaker
 Servant of the Shogun by Richard Tames. Paul Norbury Publications, Tenterden, Kent, England..
 Samurai William: The Englishman Who Opened Japan,'' by Giles Milton; ; December 2003

External links
 Williams Adams- Blue Eyed Samurai, Meeting Anjin
 "Learning from Shogun. Japanese history and Western fantasy"
 William Adams and Early English enterprise in Japan
 William Adams – The First Englishman In Japan, full text online, Internet Archive
 Will Adams Memorial
 
 
 

Samurai
Foreign samurai in Japan
1564 births
1620 deaths
16th-century English people
17th-century English people
16th-century Japanese people
17th-century Japanese people
Advisors to Tokugawa shoguns
English emigrants to Japan
English Anglicans
English sailors
Hatamoto
Japan–United Kingdom relations
People from Gillingham, Kent
Royal Navy officers
Sailors on ships of the Dutch East India Company
Foreign relations of the Tokugawa shogunate